Peter Croft (born May 18, 1958) is a Canadian rock climber and mountaineer.  He has concentrated much of his rock climbing career on big routes in Yosemite National Park, Squamish, British Columbia as well as the High Sierra.  He received The American Alpine Club’s Robert & Miriam Underhill Award in 1991.

Croft listed The Evolution Traverse (YDS class 5.9 grade VI) which links Mount Mendel, Mount Darwin, Mount Haeckel, Mount Fiske, Mount Warlow and Mount Huxley as one of his favorite climbs in Fifty Favorite Climbs: The Ultimate North American Tick List

Royal Robbins, a leading climber of the previous generation, wrote about Croft and his climbing achievements in 2000: "Peter has been my hero for many years, ever since he came blazing out of nowhere with his stunning free solo ascent of Astroman on Washington Column in Yosemite.  Tom Frost and I had made the second ascent of this route, mostly with direct aid in the early sixties.  That one could climb this route without resorting to direct aid was impressive.  To do it without a rope was astonishing.  But such was Peter's level of mastery.  That it was mastery, and not mere daring was proven by a string of free solos of similar stature, executed to perfection."

Early life
Croft was born in Nanaimo, British Columbia on May 18, 1958. He grew up in Departure Bay, British Columbia where he was introduced to climbing. Speaking with Peter in the early 2000s at Joshua Tree, he was asked what got him into free solo climbing. Peter said he was so drawn to climbing that at the end of the day when his other buddies were done and into campfire activities, he needed more. With no partner it evolved into free solo climbing.

Career highlights

Croft has completed a large number of first ascents including a number of free solo ascents.
First ascent of Blowhard, 5.12+, on The Incredible Hulk, High Sierra, 2005
First ascent of Samurai Warrior, 5.12a, High Sierra, 2005
First ascent of Venturi Effect 5.12+, on The Incredible Hulk, High Sierra, 2004
First ascent of Airstream 5.13, on The Incredible Hulk, High Sierra, 2004
First ascent of the Evolution Traverse, High Sierra, 2000
First ascent of Sponsar Brakk via 8,000-ft. rock route 5.11, Pakistan, 1998
First solo and one-day Minaret Traverse, the Sierras, 1992
First one-day link-up of the Nose and Salathé Wall on El Capitan, Yosemite, 1992
First free ascent of Moonlight Buttress 5.12d/13a, 1991
First free ascent of the Shadow 5.13, onsight of crux pitch, 1988
First free solo link-up of Astroman and the Rostrum, 1987
First free solo of Astroman 5.11, 1987
First one-day link-up of the Nose of El Capitan and Half Dome, Yosemite, 1986
First traverse of the Waddington Range, 1985
First free solo of the Rostrum 5.11, Yosemite, 1985
First free ascent of University Wall 5.12, Squamish, 1982

Books authored by Croft

References

External links
TheNorthFace.com – Peter Croft Biography (retrieved April 14, 2010)
Interview with Peter Croft by Chris Kalous, Enormocast podcast from 23 May 2015

1958 births
Living people
American rock climbers
American mountain climbers
Canadian rock climbers
Free soloists
People from Bishop, California
Sportspeople from Nanaimo